Dales Island is a small island lying  north of the Warnock Islands, to the north of the William Scoresby Archipelago. It was discovered and named by Discovery Investigations personnel on the William Scoresby in February 1936.

See also 
 List of Antarctic and sub-Antarctic islands

References 

Islands of Mac. Robertson Land